Carex lupulina, known as hop sedge or common hop sedge, is a species of sedge native to most of eastern North America. 

It was first formally named in 1805.

References

lupulina
Flora of North America